National Museum of Archaeology or National Archaeology Museum may refer to:

 National Museum of Archaeology, Albania
 National Museum of Archaeology, Bolivia
National Museum of Archeology, France
 National Museum of Archaeology, Malta
 National Museum of Archaeology, Peru
 National Museum of Archaeology, Poland
 National Archaeology Museum, Portugal

See also 
 Museo Nacional de Arqueología y Etnología, Guatemala
 Museo Nacional de Arqueología Antropología e Historia del Perú
 National Archaeological Museum (disambiguation)